The Haudenosaunee Nationals Men’s Lacrosse Team, formerly known as the Iroquois Nationals, represents the Iroquois Confederacy in international field lacrosse competition. They are currently ranked third in the world by World Lacrosse after winning Bronze at the 2018 World Lacrosse Championship. The team is organized by the First Nations Lacrosse Association.

In June 2022, the Nationals dropped Iroquois from their name, adopting the name the Haudenosaunee Nationals.

History

Background

For First Nations,  lacrosse is more than a sport. Originally played as part of a spiritual endeavour meant to praise and give thanks to the Creator, a tradition still followed today by the Iroquois Nationals. For example, before each game the Iroquois Nationals gather around their spiritual advisor who leads a traditional tobacco-burning rite, in addition to other rituals in an effort to prepare players before they take the field. The traditions attached to lacrosse extend to the wooden sticks, central to the Iroquois religion and culture. Specifically, males are given a miniature wooden lacrosse stick at birth, sleep with their stick nearby throughout their life, and even take one to the grave. It is believed that the first thing an Iroquois does after reaching the afterlife is grab the stick placed in his coffin. The importance given to these wooden lacrosse sticks stem from the belief that these are gifts from Mother Earth. The Iroquois believe that a living organism (i.e., a tree) died to make the stick and that its spirit has been transferred to the stick's owner. Therefore, the Iroquois play humbly in an attempt to honour the tree's sacrifice.

Modern team
The Iroquois Nationals men's lacrosse team was formed and sanctioned by the Grand Council of the Haudenosaunee in 1983 in preparation of friendlies at the NCAA championship in Baltimore, Maryland. The Nationals lost to the Syracuse Orange 28-5 and the Hobart Statesmen 22-14. Prior to the 1984 Summer Olympics, the Nationals held the Jim Thorpe Memorial Games and Pow-Wow, a 6-team event with local and international teams in Los Angeles. The nationals achieved their first victory over the national team of England. The following year, using their Haudenosaunee passports, the Nationals traveled and toured England losing only once.

The Iroquois Nationals team is the only First Nation's team with international recognition as a sovereign people. After being denied membership by the International Lacrosse Federation (ILF) to compete in the 1986 World Lacrosse Championship in Canada, the Iroquois hosted the teams for preliminary games at the University of Buffalo. The IFL accepted the Iroquois as a full member nation in 1988.

The Iroquois Nationals took part in their first international competition at the 1990 World Lacrosse Championship in Australia, finishing fifth out of five teams. They warmed up for the world championship by competing in the Lacrosse USA tournament in Syracuse against top men's club teams.

Women's team
Although holding cultural importance among Iroquois communities, lacrosse has been described primarily as a men's game. After the recognition of the male lacrosse team in the 1980s, a group of female Haudenosaunee lacrosse players attempted to create a national women's team. However, Haudenosaunee leaders refused to sanction a women's team citing traditional and cultural restrictions. Despite this, lacrosse remained vital to the national identity of Haudenosaunee women. Ultimately, the Haudenosaunee women were able to form a national team, becoming members of the FIL in 2008.

Nike deal
Historically, the Iroquois Nationals operated on a very small budget while simultaneously trying not to accept any financial resources from the Canadian and American governments in an attempt to assert their sovereignty through financial independence.

In 2006, the Iroquois Nationals Lacrosse Program signed a partnership with Nike, Inc. in which Nike will provide the Nationals with their brand uniforms, clothing, footwear, and other equipment. The company is to develop programs to "promote wellness-and-fitness activities in Native American communities throughout the region", and team members may go to speak to local groups. Team members will also assist in testing of sustainable produced sportswear for Nike's research and development of processes to use non-toxic dyes and biodegradable organic cotton.

Nike is the only Fortune 500 company to have such a relationship with a First Nations organization, and the Iroquois Nationals are the only such group. This partnership extends beyond simply providing equipment and apparel and includes programs to promote wellness and fitness among Native American communities. This focus on the promotion of physical activity among Native Americans is part of Nike's Native American Business Program; they have worked with the Bureau of Indian Affairs and the Indian Health Services to establish and manage physical activity programs among Native American communities. These programs are particularly important given the disproportionately high rates of obesity and diabetes among Indigenous communities.

Passport issues
The Iroquois Confederacy began issuing their own passports in 1927 and its holders were able to travel without problem for many years. However, with stricter security measures following the 9/11 terrorist attack, the European Union member states no longer recognized these passports as legal travel documents. While holders of these passports were still able to enter Canada, neither the United States nor Canada recognized the passports as valid travel documents.

These passports became an issue when the Iroquois Nationals attempted to enter England for the 2010 World Lacrosse Championship held in Manchester. The Nationals were unable to attend and compete in the 2010 World Lacrosse Championship in England as the United Kingdom did not accept their Iroquois passports. The Nationals’ players were told by British officials to obtain either U.S. or Canadian passports if they wished to enter the country, as the team's 23 players were eligible to be issued passports from these countries. The Iroquois Nationals refused to travel with Canadian or American passports, arguing that this would be a strike against their identity. As a result, the Nationals were forced to forfeit their three preliminary games.  In 2015, while traveling to the United Kingdom (UK) for the Under-19 World Championship in Scotland, the Haudenosaunee women's national lacrosse team were refused entrance into the country due to the same passport issues faced by the Iroquois Nationals in 2010. Ultimately, like their male counterparts, the Haudenosaunee refused to travel under Canadian or American passports. In 2018, the Iroquois Nationals’ travel arrangements to Israel for the World Lacrosse Championship were delayed due to passport issues once again. However, after the intervention of the Federation of International Lacrosse and the local organizing committee, the Israeli and Canadian governments were able to resolve the issue and lift the travel restrictions. As a result, the Iroquois Nationals arrived just before the opening ceremonies and their first game.

Awards

World Lacrosse Championship

Overall results

1990

1994

1998

2002

2006

2010

2014

2018

World Games

Overall results

2022

Other tournaments and games

1980s

1990s

2000s

2010s

2020s

See also
First Nations Lacrosse Association
Iroquois national indoor lacrosse team
Haudenosaunee women's national lacrosse team
World Lacrosse Championship

References

External links
Haudenosaunee Nationals

Lacrosse of the Iroquois Confederacy
National lacrosse teams
National sports teams of the Iroquois Confederacy
First Nations sportspeople